Betterment is an American financial advisory company which provides digital investment, retirement and cash management services.

The company is based in New York City, registered with the Securities and Exchange Commission, and a member of the Financial Industry Regulatory Authority. It is a registered investment advisor and broker-dealer.

As of December 2022, Betterment had more than $32 billion of assets under management and over 775,000 customer accounts.

History

Foundation and launch 
Betterment was founded in 2008 in New York City by Jon Stein, a Columbia Business School MBA graduate, and Eli Broverman, a lawyer out of NYU School of Law.

Betterment, LLC was established as a Delaware corporation on April 7, 2009. The parent company for Betterment LLC and Betterment Securities, Betterment Holdings, Inc. was established in Delaware on January 29, 2008.

The company launched at TechCrunch Disrupt New York in June 2010, and won the award of "Biggest New York Disruptor." Within 24 hours, Betterment had attracted nearly 400 early customers, and the company began talks with early investors.

Operations 
Betterment's business model includes three areas of business: retail investment, a platform for advisors, and a 401(k) product for businesses.

The company's personalized financial advice uses principles-based robo-advisor technologies such as computer algorithms. Licensed financial advisors provide over-the-phone consultations to customers who opt for additional support. Betterment's primary retail platform offers taxable and tax-advantaged investment accounts, including traditional and Roth individual retirement accounts (IRAs).

In October 2014, Betterment launched a business-to-business offering called Betterment Institutional, subsequently renamed Betterment for Advisors, a digital platform for managing client assets using Betterment's built-in financial advice. In January 2017, the Financial Planning Association (FPA) and Betterment for Advisors ran a program on digital investment advice for the association's members.

In January 2016, the company launched Betterment for Business—a 401(k) platform aimed at small- to medium-sized businesses. It is built on the same underlying investment strategy and generally costs less than most traditional 401(k) plans. In February 2022, the business rebranded to Betterment at Work and announced the launch of a new student loan management solution, as well as the acquisition of the partner and customer relationships of Gradvisor, a platform that provides personalized college savings plans.

In December 2020, Betterment's founder Jon Stein stepped down as CEO and was succeeded by Viacom Media Networks's former COO Sarah Levy.

In November 2021, Betterment released a new logo with an icon representing a rising sun.

In February 2022, Betterment announced it had acquired Makara, a cryptocurrency portfolio manager. In October 2022, Betterment launched a crypto offering Crypto Investing by Betterment, in which customers can invest in crypto assets.

In December 2022, Betterment made an adjustment to their pricing structure.

Finances 
Betterment has received funding from Bessemer Venture Partners, Menlo Ventures, Anthemis Group, Kinnevik, Francisco Partners, Globespan Capital Partners, Citi Ventures, The Private Shares Fund, Aflac Ventures and ID8 Investments.

In September 2021, the company secured $160 million in growth capital, consisting of a $60 million Series F equity round led by Treasury and a $100 million credit facility, established with ORIX Corporation USA’s Growth Capital group and Runway Growth Capital. This financing valued the company at nearly $1.3 billion.

References

External links

Robo-advisors
Financial services companies established in 2008
Financial services companies based in New York City
Privately held companies based in New York City